The Herzl Award is awarded annually by the Department for Zionist Activities of the World Zionist Organization (WZO) to outstanding young men and women in recognition of their exceptional efforts on behalf of Israel and the Zionist cause. The award was first awarded in 1954 to Winston Churchill, on the centennial anniversary of Theodore Herzl's death.

Background 
Herzl was the father of political Zionism. Even though he died at the young age of 44, of which only 9 were dedicated to the Zionist cause, he was able to mobilize the forces and create the infrastructure that would revolutionize the Jewish world and bring about the realization of the Jewish people's age-old dream of returning to Zion.

Award requirements 
According to the site of the WZO candidates are nominated by Zionist Federations around the world for achievement in one or more of several fields:
 Encouraging aliyah
 Promoting Zionist education (formal or informal)
 Fostering the study of Hebrew
 Advocating on behalf of Israel 
 Furthering the development of Israel as an exemplary society
 Contributing to the advancement of Zionist thought
 Organizing on behalf of the Zionist movement

Nominees must be no older than 44, Herzl's age at the time of his death.

Recipients 
All Herzl Award recipients receive a distinctive certificate and an engraved cast bronze trophy, as well as being inscribed in a special Herzl album in Jerusalem.

In addition, the Winner of the South African Zionist Federation's "Zionist Quiz" for schools is awarded a Herzl Prize (through 2009).

References

External links
 "Jewish Ledger"
 "Jewish Agency"

Israeli awards
Lists of Israeli award winners
Politics awards
Zionism